Compsoptera argentaria is a moth of the family Geometridae. It was described by Gottlieb August Wilhelm Herrich-Schäffer in 1839. It is found on Sicily.

References

Moths described in 1839
Ennominae
Moths of Europe